Paul Archibald Vianney Ansah (born 20 February 1938) was a Ghanaian freedom fighter. He was once described as "the uncaged bird in Ghana's politics", at a time when press freedom was denied. He was affectionately called PAVA. He lived from 1938 to 1993.

He is specifically credited with setting the tone for the study and practice of mass communications in Ghana.

References

External links

1938 births
1993 deaths